Tauzin is a surname. Notable people with the surname include:

 Billy Tauzin (born 1943), American lobbyist and politician
 Billy Tauzin III (born 1973), American politician
 Henri Tauzin (1879–1918), French athlete
 Louis Tauzin (1842-1915), French painter
 Louis-Eugène Tauzin (1882–?), French sculptor; son of Louis Tauzin
 Lucas Tauzin (born 1998), French rugby union footballer
 Mario Tauzin (1909–1979), French artist

French-language surnames